Holy Trinity Church in Torbryan, near Ipplepen in Devon, England, was built in the 15th century. It is recorded in the National Heritage List for England as a designated Grade I listed building, and is now a redundant church in the care of the Churches Conservation Trust.  It was vested in the Trust on 1 July 1987.

The church was built between 1450 and 1470. It has a Perpendicular three-stage tower with an octagonal stair turret on the south wall. The vestry was added in the 19th century.

The interior includes a medieval carved rood-screen, with panels showing paintings of saints and stained glass from the same period. In August 2013 thieves "hacked out" two panels depicting Saint Victor of Marseilles and Saint Margaret of Antioch and damaged another that depicted a female saint. The CCT was concerned that the panels could be taken out of the country and sold. The theft, from what was described as "... probably the best preserved medieval rood screen in the country", was widely reported by the media. The panels were later recovered by the Metropolitan Police Art and Antiques Unit after a collector saw them in an online sale and were restored and reinstalled.

See also
 List of churches preserved by the Churches Conservation Trust in South West England

References

Buildings and structures completed in 1470
Torbryan
Torbryan
Churches preserved by the Churches Conservation Trust
Teignbridge